Cercospora brassicicola is a plant pathogen.

References

External links

brassicicola
Fungal plant pathogens and diseases